San Andrés Zabache  is a town and municipality in Oaxaca in south-western Mexico. The municipality covers an area of 35.72 km². 
It is part of the Ejutla District in the south of the Valles Centrales Region.

As of 2005, the municipality had a total population of 756.

References

Municipalities of Oaxaca